University of Computer Studies (Pakokku) (formerly Computer University (Pakokku), Government Computer College (Pakokku)) is a public undergraduate university located in Pakokku, Magway Region, Myanmar. Students study various computer disciplines, including hardware, networking, programming, imaging, and artificial intelligence. Its uniform is white for upper wear and light blue for longyi.

History
Government Computer College (Pakokku) was established on 21 January 2002. It became Computer University (Pakokku) on 20 January 2007 and was later renamed University of Computer Studies (Pakokku).

Degrees
The university offers five-year Bachelor of Computer Science (B.C.Sc) and Bachelor of Computer Technology (B.C.Tech) degree programs.

Departments
Academics are divided into the following departments:
 Faculty of Computer Science
 Faculty of Computer Systems and Technologies
 Faculty of Information Science
 Faculty of Computing
 Department of Information Technology Supporting & Maintenance
 Department of Natural Science
 Department of Languages
 Library

Practical rooms
The University has practical rooms for English language listening and for computer and physics practical works. It has a library with especially computer-related books and journals as well as more general subject matter.

References

External links
 

Universities and colleges in Magway Region